Before it adopted the metric system in 1816, the area that now constitutes Belgium used a number of units of measurement to measure different types of quantities including length, mass, and area. Since 1820, the International Metric System has been compulsory in Belgium. Initially, different names were used for units like metre, litre, kilogram, etc.

Pre-metric Units 

Before 1820, different units were used in the area that now constitutes Belgium. Belgium became an independent country in 1830.

Length

Different units were used to measure length in Belgium. One pied was equal to 1/20 perche.

Mass

A number of units were used to measure mass in Belgium. Some other units are provided below:

1 loth = 1/32 livre

1 once = 1/16 livre

1 marc 1/2 livre

1 stein = 8 livre

1 quintal = 100 livre

1 chariot = 165 livre

1 balle = 200 livre

1 schiffpfund = 300 livre

1 charge = 400 livre.

Area

Different units were used to measure area in Belgium.  One arpent was equal to 400 perche2 (130.6 a)

Units with Metric System

In the starting era of the metric system in Belgium, other names were used for metric units, including aune for metre, litron for litre, livre for kilogram, once for hectogram, lood for decigram, and wigtje for gram.

References

Belgian culture         
Belgium